Chlorocypha consueta (ruby jewel) is a species of damselfly in the family Chlorocyphidae.

Distribution and status
Tropical Africa: Democratic Republic of the Congo; Malawi; Mozambique; Tanzania; Zambia; Zimbabwe. A widespread species; no major threats are known.

Habitat
This species is most common along streams with gallery forest, but is also found on rivers and in more open habitats.

References

External links

 Chlorocypha consueta on African Dragonflies and Damselflies Online

Odonata of Africa
Insects of South Africa
Chlorocyphidae
Insects described in 1899
Taxonomy articles created by Polbot